The 2015 Cactus Bowl was an American college football bowl game that was played on January 2, 2015, at Sun Devil Stadium in Tempe, Arizona. It was one of the 2014–15 bowl games that concluded the 2014 FBS football season. The game started at 10:15 p.m. ET and was televised on ESPN.  Sponsored by the TicketCity ticket broker company, the game was officially known as the TicketCity Cactus Bowl.

The 26th edition of the Cactus Bowl featured the Oklahoma State Cowboys from the Big 12 Conference and the Washington Huskies from the Pac-12 Conference.  Oklahoma State beat Washington by a score of 30–22.

At 45 °F, the game featured the coldest kickoff temperature in Cactus Bowl history.

Teams
The game represents the third overall meeting between these two teams, with the series previously tied 1–1. The last time these two teams met was in 1985.

Game summary

Scoring summary

Source:

Statistics

References

2014–15 NCAA football bowl games
2015
2015
2015
2015 in sports in Arizona
January 2015 sports events in the United States